The Winterbottom Stakes is a Perth Racing Group 1 Thoroughbred horse race held under weight for age conditions, for horses aged three and upwards, over a distance of 1200 metres at Ascot Racecourse, Perth, Western Australia in November. Prizemoney is A$1,500,000.

History
The race has grown in importance over the recent years with increases in prizemoney and class and has become Western Australia's premier sprint race. The race is run on the middle weekend of the Perth Summer Carnival, being run the week after the Railway Stakes and WA Guineas, and the weekend before the Kingston Town Classic.

In 2003 the race was run at Belmont Park Racecourse.

The prizemoney was raised to $1 million in 2015.

Grade
1937–1978 - Principal race
1979–2010 - Group 2
2011 onwards - Group 1

Distance
1952–1971 - 7 furlongs (~1400 metres)
1972–1993 – 1400 metres
1994 onwards - 1200 metres

Winners

 2022 - Paulele
 2021 - Graceful Girl
 2020 - Elite Street
 2019 - Hey Doc
 2018 - Voodoo Lad
 2017 - Viddora
 2016 - Takedown
 2015 - Buffering
 2014 - Magnifisio	
 2013 - Buffering
 2012 - Barakey
 2011 - Ortensia
 2010 - Hadabeclorka
 2009 - Ortensia
 2008 - Takeover Target
 2007 - Glory Hunter
 2006 - Marasco
 2005 - Miss Andretti
 2004 - Ellicorsam
 2003 - Hardrada
 2002 - Hardrada
 2001 - Fair Alert
 2000 - Noble Sky
 1999 - Double Blue
 1998 - Bradson
 1997 - Cranky Tikit
 1996 - French Sound
 1995 - Jacks Or Better
 1994 - Petite Amour
 1993 - Sir Tinka
 1992 - Barrosa Boy -
 1991 - M'Lady's Jewel
 1990 - Century God
 1989 - Carry A Smile
 1988 - Sky Filou
 1987 - Placid Ark
 1986 - Fimiston
 1985 - Jungle Mist
 1984 - Casshoney
 1983 - Hanging In
 1982 - Nitro Lad
 1981 - Soldier Of Fortune
 1980 - Scarlet Gem
 1979 - Asian Beau
 1978 - Marjoleo
 1977 - Romantic Dream
 1976 - Belinda's Star
 1975 - Belinda's Star
 1974 - My Friend Paul
 1973 - Starglow
 1972 - Acello
 1971 - La Trice
 1970 - La Trice
 1969 - Sherolythe
 1968 - Torecan
 1967 - Railway Boy
 1966 - Aquitania
 1965 - Watersan
 1964 - Copper Son
 1963 - Big Bob
 1962 - Nicopolis
 1961 - Coco
 1960 - On Guard
 1959 - Young Filipino
 1958 - Bebe Grande
 1957 - Fairflow
 1956 - Mcharry
 1955 - Asteroid
 1954 - Chestnut Lady
 1953 - Asteroid
 1952 - Raconteur

See also

 List of Australian Group races
 Group races

Notes

Group 1 stakes races in Australia
Open sprint category horse races
Sport in Perth, Western Australia